Maxwell Clifford Binnington  (born 8 March 1949) is an Australian sprinter. He competed in the men's 4 × 400 metres relay at the 1976 Summer Olympics.

References

External links
 

1949 births
Living people
Athletes (track and field) at the 1976 Summer Olympics
Athletes (track and field) at the 1974 British Commonwealth Games
Athletes (track and field) at the 1978 Commonwealth Games
Australian male sprinters
Australian male hurdlers
Olympic athletes of Australia
Commonwealth Games medallists in athletics
Commonwealth Games silver medallists for Australia
Commonwealth Games bronze medallists for Australia
Recipients of the Medal of the Order of Australia
Recipients of the Australian Sports Medal
Medallists at the 1974 British Commonwealth Games
Medallists at the 1978 Commonwealth Games